Last Chance to Make Amends is the debut studio album by American heavy metal band Ice Nine Kills, self-released in 2006. At the time, the group employed a sound that is a "mixture of alt rock, pop punk, and ska" before their shift to post-hardcore and metalcore years later. It is the only album to feature members Andrew Justin Smith and Grant Newsted.

Song information
"What I Really Learned in Study Hall" is the first song in the "What I Learned in Study Hall" trilogy of songs.

The title of the song "Murders and Acquisitions" is a reference to the 2000 film American Psycho. The title of the song "I Do and I Don't" is a quote from the movie Best in Show.

In the first edition released in April, the final track, "Family Unites" ends at 5:07. In the re-issue released in December, it is followed by two hidden tracks. The first one from 6:32 to 9:00 is an instrumental synth reprise of "Family Unites", and the second one from 9:54 to 12:58 is a phone call followed by another synth track.

Track listing

Personnel
 Spencer Charnas – lead vocals, guitar
 Jeremy Schwartz – guitar, vocals, synths
 Andrew Justin Smith – bass, backing vocals
 Grant Newsted – drums, percussion
 Rick Mosher – producer, engineer, mixer
 Tom Evans – technical engineer

References

2006 albums
Ice Nine Kills albums
Self-released albums